In chemistry, a carbazide is a functional group with the general formula RNH-NH(C=O)NH-NHR. They can be derived from the condensation of carbonic acid with a hydrazine. Carbohydrazide is the simplest carbazide, with another common carbazide being diphenylcarbazide, which is used as an analytical reagent.

Diphenylcarbazide forms an intense blue color with chromium in the hexavalent state.  It has an absorptivity coefficient of about 3400. That means very small amounts of chromium can be detected; 25 micrograms in 25 mL of solution are too dark to read on a spectral device, so concentrations well below that can be detected.

Thiocarbazide
The sulfur analog is called a thiocarbazide, of which thiocarbohydrazide is the simplest example.

Carbazone and thiocarbazone
A carbazone is a partially oxidized carbazide with the general formula R=NNH(C=O)NH-NHR. The sulfur analog is called a thiocarbazone, of which dithizone is an example.

See also
 Semicarbazide
 Semicarbazone

References

Hydrazides
Functional groups